Fernando Lázaro Carreter (Zaragoza, April 13, 1923 — March 4, 2004, in Madrid) was a Spanish linguist, journalist and literary critic.

Carreter worked to improve the way the Spanish language is spoken and written, and penned the hugely popular 1997 book El Dardo en la Palabra (The Dart in the Word), a collection of articles he wrote on linguistic gaffes in the media. Lázaro Carreter was a member, occupying the Seat "R", of the prestigious Royal Spanish Academy (Real Academia Española), the language's official referee, from 1972 until his death, and was its president for seven years, 1991-1998. He taught at the Autonomous University of Madrid.

He died on 4 March 2004 in Madrid at aged 80 from a multiple organ failure.

References

External links
 
 
 

1923 births
2004 deaths
Spanish essayists
Spanish male writers
Linguists from Spain
Spanish literary critics
Members of the Royal Spanish Academy
Academic staff of the Autonomous University of Madrid
Male essayists
Deaths from multiple organ failure
20th-century essayists
20th-century linguists
20th-century Spanish journalists